Walter Buser (14 April 1926 – 17 August 2019) was a Swiss politician from the Social Democratic Party of Switzerland (SDP).

Biography
Buser was born in Lausen, Switzerland, the son of a farmer. He studied at Bâle and at Bern, obtaining a doctorate in law in 1958. From 1950, he was a legal advisor and editor of Social-Democratic newspapers. From 1956 to 1962 he was chief editor of the "Socialist Federal House correspondence".

In 1965 he joined the federal administration and spent three years as head of the Legal and Information Service of the Department of Home Affairs. The Federal Council elected him Vice-Chancellor in 1968; in this capacity he was responsible for legal services and information throughout the federal administration. In 1977 he was appointed an Associate Professor of Public Law at the University of Basel, where he taught in particular the administrative law of the federation.

After the resignation of Chancellor Karl Huber in 1981, Buser campaigned against Joseph Voyame of the CVP and Hans-Ulrich Ernst of the SVP. He defeated his opponents and became the first Social Democratic chancellor. Buser introduced regular press conferences and expanded the Federal Chancellery to a staff office of the Federal Council. He also adopted electronic data processing for the Federal Chancellery. He resigned his post in 1991. Buser died on 17 August 2019 at the age of 93.

References

1926 births
2019 deaths
Federal Chancellors of Switzerland
Social Democratic Party of Switzerland politicians
20th-century Swiss politicians
People from Basel-Landschaft